The Women's March was a worldwide protest on January 21, 2017, the day after the inauguration of Donald Trump as US president. It was prompted by Trump's policy positions and rhetoric, which protesters called misogynistic or otherwise threatening to the rights of women. It was the largest single-day protest in U.S. history. The goal of the annual marches is to advocate legislation and policies regarding human rights and other issues, including women's rights, immigration reform, healthcare reform, disability justice, reproductive rights, the environment, LGBTQ rights, racial equality, freedom of religion, workers' rights and tolerance. According to organizers, the goal was to "send a bold message to our new administration on their first day in office, and to the world that women's rights are human rights".

The main protest was in Washington, D.C., and is known as the Women's March on Washington with many other marches taking place worldwide. The Washington March was streamed live on YouTube, Facebook, and Twitter. The Washington March drew over 470,000 people. Between 3,267,134 and 5,246,670 people participated in the marches in the U.S., approximately 1.0 to 1.6 percent of the U.S. population. Worldwide participation has been estimated at over seven million. At least 408 marches were reported to have been planned in the U.S. and 168 in 81 other countries. After the marches, organizers reported that around 673 marches took place worldwide, on all seven continents, 29 in Canada, 20 in Mexico, and 1 in Antarctica. The crowds were peaceful: no arrests were made in D.C., Chicago, Los Angeles, New York City, or Seattle, where a combined total of about two million people marched. The organization's website states that they wanted to adhere to "the nonviolent ideology of the Civil Rights movement". Following the march, the organizers of the Women's March on Washington posted the "10 Actions for the first 100 Days" campaign for joint activism to keep up momentum from the march.

Background

Organizers 

On November 9, 2016, the first day after Donald Trump was elected President of the United States, in reaction to Trump's election campaign and political views, and to his defeat of presidential nominee Hillary Clinton, Teresa Shook of Hawaii created a Facebook event and invited friends to march on Washington in protest. Similar Facebook pages created by Evvie Harmon, Fontaine Pearson, Bob Bland (a New York fashion designer), Breanne Butler, and others quickly led to thousands of women signing up to march. Harmon, Pearson, and Butler decided to unite their efforts and consolidate their pages, beginning the official Women's March on Washington. To ensure that the march was led by women of differing races and backgrounds, Vanessa Wruble, co-founder, and co-president of Okayafrica, served as Head of Campaign Operations and brought on Tamika D. Mallory, Carmen Perez and Linda Sarsour to serve as National Co-Chairs alongside Bland. Former Miss New Jersey USA Janaye Ingram served as Head of Logistics. Filmmaker Paola Mendoza served as artistic director and a National Organizer.

During "the first hours of the first meeting for what would become the Women's March," Mallory and Perez allegedly put forward a debunked antisemitic conspiracy theory regarding Jews and the slave trade. No one who was in the room spoke about it for almost two years. Mallory and Bland deny that the offensive content in the conversation took place, but, according to Tablet Magazine, "multiple sources with knowledge of what happened confirmed the story." Several journalists who shared the story were emailed by a PR agency which claimed to be able to disprove the article, but would only share their information on condition of journalists keeping it off the record. Andrea González-Ramírez, a journalist from Refinery29, claimed to have agreed to the PR firm's request, but the PR firm's fact checking failed to disprove Tablet Magazines claims.

According to The New York Times, opposition to and defiance of Trump infused the protests, which were sometimes directly called anti-Trump protests. Organizers stated that they were "not targeting Trump specifically" and that the event was "more about being proactive about women's rights". Sarsour called it "a stand on social justice and human rights issues ranging from race, ethnicity, gender, religion, immigration and healthcare". Wruble stated that "it's about feminism [...] But it's about more than that: It's about basic equality for all people."

Planned Parenthood partnered with the march by providing staff and offering knowledge related to planning a large-scale event. Planned Parenthood president Cecile Richards said that the march would "send a strong message to the incoming administration that millions of people across this country are prepared to fight attacks on reproductive healthcare, abortion services and access to Planned Parenthood, [which] hopes that [in the future] many of the protesters will mobilize in its defense when Trump and congressional Republicans make their attempt to strip the organization of millions in federal funding". The national organizing director stressed the importance of continuing action at a local level and remaining active after the event.

National co-chairs 
Vanessa Wruble, co-founder, brought on Tamika D. Mallory, Carmen Perez and Linda Sarsour to serve as National Co-Chairs alongside Bob Bland. The four co-chairs were Linda Sarsour, the executive director of the Arab American Association of New York; Tamika Mallory, a political organizer and former executive director of the National Action Network; Carmen Perez, an executive director of the political action group The Gathering for Justice; and Bob Bland, a fashion designer who focuses on ethical manufacturing. Gloria Steinem, Harry Belafonte, LaDonna Harris, Angela Davis and Dolores Huerta served as honorary co-chairs.

International 
Seven women coordinated marches outside the U.S. The women were: Brit-Agnes Svaeri, Oslo, Norway; Marissa McTasney, Toronto, Canada; Karen Olson, Geneva, Switzerland; Kerry Haggerty, London, United Kingdom; Rebecca Turnbow, Sydney, Australia; and Breanne Butler and Evvie Harmon in the United States. The women organized the international marches through social media and had weekly Skype meetings to plot strategy.

Policy platform 
On January 12, the march organizers released a policy platform addressing reproductive rights, immigration reform, healthcare reform, religious discrimination (primarily that against Muslim Americans), LGBTQ rights, gender and racial inequities (primarily those that favor men and Non-Hispanic whites, respectively), workers' rights, and other issues. "Build bridges, not walls" (a reference to Trump's proposals for a border wall) became popular worldwide after the Trump's inaugural address, and was a common refrain throughout the march.

The organizers also addressed environmental issues: "We believe that every person and every community in our nation has the right to clean water, clean air, and access to and enjoyment of public lands. We believe that our environment and our climate must be protected and that our land and natural resources cannot be exploited for corporate gain or greed—especially at the risk of public safety and health."

Preparation and planning

Name origin 

Originally billed as the "Million Women March," Wruble renamed the event to mirror the March on Washington for Jobs and Freedom, the historic civil rights rally on the Mall where Martin Luther King Jr. delivered his "I Have a Dream" speech. The rally also paid tribute to the 1997 Million Woman March in Philadelphia, in which hundreds of thousands of African American women are said to have participated.

Logistics planning 

Because of scheduling conflicts at the Lincoln Memorial, a permit was secured on December 9 to start the march on Independence Avenue at the southwest corner of the Capitol building and continue along the National Mall.

By January 20, 2017, 222,000 people had RSVP'd as going to the Washington, D.C., march and 251,000 had indicated interest. On January 16, 2017, Fox News reported that authorities were expecting "a crowd of almost 500,000 people", and the permit for the march issued by the National Park Service was revised by the head of D.C.'s Homeland Security department to half a million people—significantly more than the estimated attendance at President Donald Trump's inauguration ceremony the previous day.

Partnerships 
In late December, organizers announced that over 100 organizations would provide assistance during the march and support the event across their social media platforms. By January 18, more than 400 organizations were listed as "partners" on the March's official website.

Planned Parenthood (which has received federal funding since 1970, when President Richard Nixon signed into law the Family Planning Services and Population Research Act) and the Natural Resources Defense Council were listed as the two "premier partners". Other organizations listed as partners included the AFL–CIO, Amnesty International USA, the Mothers of the Movement, the National Center for Lesbian Rights, the National Organization for Women, MoveOn.org, Human Rights Watch, Code Pink, Black Girls Rock!, the NAACP, the American Indian Movement, Emily's List, Oxfam, Greenpeace USA, and the League of Women Voters.

On January 13, event organizers granted the anti-abortion feminist group New Wave Feminists partnership status. But after the organization's involvement was publicized in The Atlantic, it was removed from the partners page on the march's website. Other anti-abortion groups that had been granted partnership status, including Abby Johnson's And Then There Were None (ATTWN) and Stanton Healthcare, were subsequently unlisted as partners as well. New Wave Feminists and Johnson still participated in the official march, alongside other anti-abortion groups such as ATTWN, Students for Life of America, and Life Matters Journal.

Participation 

While organizers had originally expected over 200,000 people, the march ended up drawing between 440,000 to 500,000 in Washington D.C. The Washington Metro system had its second-busiest day ever with over a million trips taken, considerably larger than the inauguration day's ridership and second only to the first inauguration of Barack Obama. The New York Times reported that crowd-scientists estimate that the Women's March was three times the size of the Trump inauguration, which they estimate at 160,000 attendees. However, The Washington Post and The New York Times have stated that it is difficult to accurately calculate crowd size and other estimates of the Trump inauguration range from 250,000 to 600,000 people.

An estimated 3,300,000 – 4,600,000 people participated in the United States and up to 5 million did worldwide.

Packed cars, buses, airplanes, and trains commuted protesters to the march. The large crowds enabled Washington's Metro to break 1,000,000 passengers for only the second time in its history. The 1,001,613 trips are the second busiest day, the highest counted total (as the highest, from Obama's First Inauguration is only an estimate) and the highest single-day ridership for a weekend day breaking the previous record of 825,437 trips set during the Rally to Restore Sanity and/or Fear. It was also reported that over 45,000 disabled people in attendance, led by the organizing efforts of disability justice activist Mia Ives-Rublee.

Washington, D.C.

Speakers 

The official list of speakers included America Ferrera, Scarlett Johansson, and Gloria Steinem. Other speakers were Sophie Cruz, Angela Davis, and Michael Moore, as well as Cecile Richards, Ilyasah Shabazz, Janet Mock, LaDonna Harris, Janelle Monáe, Maryum Ali, Rabbi Sharon Brous, Sister Simone Campbell, Ashley Judd, Melissa Harris-Perry, Randi Weingarten, Van Jones, Kristin Rowe-Finkbeiner, Roslyn Brock, Mayor Muriel Bowser, Senators Tammy Duckworth (D-IL) and Kamala Harris (D-CA), Donna Hylton, Ai-jen Poo, and Raquel Willis.

Steinem commented "Our constitution does not begin with 'I, the President.' It begins with, 'We, the People.' I am proud to be one of thousands who have come to Washington to make clear that we will keep working for a democracy in which we are linked as human beings, not ranked by race or gender or class or any other label."

Ferrera stated, "If we – the millions of Americans who believe in common decency, in the greater good, in justice for all – if we fall into the trap by separating ourselves by our causes and our labels, then we will weaken our fight and we will lose. But if we commit to what aligns us, if we stand together steadfast and determined, then we stand a chance of saving the soul of our country."

Johansson called for long-term change: "Once the heaviness [of the election] began to subside, an opportunity has presented itself to make real long-term change, not just for future Americans, but in the way we view our responsibility to get involved with and stay active in our communities. Let this weight not drag you down, but help to get your heels stuck in."

The youngest presenter at the Washington D.C. march, 6-year-old Sophie Cruz, said, "Let us fight with love, faith, and courage so that our families will not be destroyed," and ended her speech saying, "I also want to tell the children not to be afraid, because we are not alone. There are still many people that have their hearts filled with love. Let's keep together and fight for the rights. God is with us." Cruz repeated her speech in Spanish.

Alicia Keys performed at the rally saying, "We are mothers. We are caregivers. We are artists. We are activists. We are entrepreneurs, doctors, leaders of industry and technology. Our potential is unlimited. We rise." Angela Davis said, "We recognize that we are collective agents of history and that history cannot be deleted like web pages." Maryum Ali also spoke, saying, "Don't get frustrated, get involved. Don't complain, organize."

Other U.S. locations 

Across the United States, there were a total of 408 planned marches.

International 

Marches occurred worldwide, with 198 in 84 other countries. Organisers of the event reported 673 marches worldwide, including 20 in Mexico and 29 in Canada. Women in India also organized a nationwide march on January 21, 2017, called I Will Go Out to demand access to safe public spaces. It was held in small countries such as Belgium, Costa Rica, Latvia. The movement also took place in countries in Africa, including Kenya, Nigeria, and Tanzania all held marches calling for women to have equal rights, and specifically demanding an end to violence against women.

Participation by well-known people

Political figures 

U.S. Senator Cory Booker, former U.S. Secretary of State John Kerry, and civil rights activist Jesse Jackson attended the Washington march. Anne-Marie Slaughter, president of New America and former Director of Policy Planning at the U.S. State Department, attended the New York City march. John Lewis attended the Atlanta rally, which saw more than 60,000 march to the Georgia State Capitol.

Senator Bernie Sanders of Vermont delivered a speech at the march in Montpelier in front of the Vermont State House, as did other Vermont political figures, such as former Governor Madeleine Kunin and current Lieutenant Governor David Zuckerman. Both Massachusetts Senators Elizabeth Warren and Ed Markey participated in the Boston Women's March, along with Mayor Marty Walsh.

Jacinda Ardern, Prime Minister of New Zealand since October 2017, gave a speech after marching in Auckland; New Zealand was chronologically the first country in the world to participate in the march.

Additional celebrity participation 
In Washington, DC:

 Christina Aguilera
 Jaimie Alexander
 Jane Alexander
 Patricia Arquette
 Alec Baldwin
 Samantha Bee
 Chloe Bennet
 Melissa Benoist
 Tom Bergeron
 Mayim Bialik
 Jennifer Finney Boylan
 Steve Buscemi
 Sophia Bush
 Mary Chapin Carpenter
 Jessica Chastain
 Cher
 Chris Colfer
 Katie Couric
 Darren Criss
 Jackie Cruz
 Rosario Dawson
 Lea DeLaria
 Adam Dell
 Fran Drescher
 Lena Dunham
 Edie Falco
 Sen. Al Franken
 Ana Gasteyer
 Gina Gershon
 Elizabeth Gilbert
 Jake Gyllenhaal
 Maggie Gyllenhaal
 Felicity Huffman
 Jidenna
 Scarlett Johansson
 Leslie Jones
 Joshua Kushner
 Padma Lakshmi
 Brie Larson
 Natasha Lyonne
 Macklemore
 Madonna
 Julianna Margulies
 Debi Mazar
 Frances McDormand
 Rose McGowan
 Debra Messing
 Chloë Grace Moretz
 Kathy Najimy
 Lupita Nyong'o
 Elliot Page
 Katy Perry
 Amy Poehler
 Patricia Richardson
 Tim Robbins
 Julia Roberts
 Michelle Rodriguez
 Samantha Ronson
 Paul Rudd
 Amy Schumer
 Fisher Stevens
 Jason Sudeikis
 Amber Tamblyn
 Chrissy Teigen
 Bella Thorne
 Marisa Tomei
 Katherine Waterston
 Emma Watson
 Olivia Wilde
 Jessica Williams
 Evan Rachel Wood
 Zendaya
 Dolph Ziggler

In New York City:

 Drew Barrymore
 Courteney Cox
 Robert De Niro
 Whoopi Goldberg
 Blake Lively
 Helen Mirren
 Julianne Moore
 Cynthia Nixon
 Yoko Ono
 Rosie Perez
 Rihanna
 Mark Ruffalo
 Taylor Schilling
 Al Sharpton
 Jenna Ushkowitz
 Naomi Watts
 Shailene Woodley

In Los Angeles:

 Fred Armisen
 Rosanna Arquette
 Lance Bass
 Jessica Biel
 Rowan Blanchard
 Laverne Cox
 Jamie Lee Curtis
 Miley Cyrus
 The Edge
 Alfred Enoch
 Jack Falahee
 Frances Fisher
 Jane Fonda
 James Franco
 Joseph Gordon-Levitt
 Ariana Grande
 Clark Gregg
 Jennifer Grey
 Marcia Gay Harden
 Vanessa Hudgens
 Helen Hunt
 Angelica Huston
 Josh Hutcherson
 Kesha
 Aja Naomi King
 Zoe Kravitz
 Juliette Lewis
 Julia Louis-Dreyfus
 Demi Lovato
 Idina Menzel
 Moby
 Mandy Moore
 Pink
 Natalie Portman
 Helen Reddy
 Nicole Richie
 Gina Rodriguez
 Tracee Ellis Ross
 Sia
 Willow Smith
 Regina Spektor
 Barbra Streisand
 Lily Tomlin
 Rufus Wainwright
 Kerry Washington
 Ming-Na Wen
 Alfre Woodard
 Bonnie Wright

In Park City, Utah:

 Dianna Agron
 Kevin Bacon
 Jennifer Beals
 Maria Bello
 Benjamin Bratt
 Connie Britton
 Ty Burrell
 Laurie David
 Laura Dern
 Zoey Deutch
 Chelsea Handler
 Joshua Jackson
 John Legend
 Rooney Mara
 Mary McCormack
 Chris O'Dowd
 Tyler Oakley
 Nick Offerman
 Laura Prepon
 Jason Ritter
 Jenny Slate
 Kristen Stewart
 Charlize Theron
 Aisha Tyler

In London, UK:

 Riz Ahmed
 Gillian Anderson
 Peter Capaldi
 Josh Gad
 Rebecca Hall
 Ian McKellen
 Lin-Manuel Miranda
 Thandie Newton
 John C. Reilly

Elsewhere:

In San Francisco, performer and activist Joan Baez serenaded the crowd with "We Shall Overcome" in Spanish. Comedian Colin Mochrie and Actress Eliza Dushku attended Boston's march. Singer Carole King was among 30 residents rallying in Stanley, Idaho. Author Stephen King participated in a march in Sarasota, Florida.  Author Judy Blume participated in a march in Key West, Florida.  Singer Kacey Musgraves and comedian Chris Rock were both present in Nashville, Tennessee. Seth Rogen tweeted video from New Orleans.  Actor Julia Sweeney addressed an indoor crowd in her native town of Spokane, Washington. Actor Rami Malek was present in Paris, France.

Messaging and visual imagery

Pussyhat Project 

The Pussyhat Project was a nationwide effort initiated by Krista Suh and Jayna Zweiman, a screenwriter and architect located in Los Angeles, to create pussyhats, pink hats to be worn at the march for visual impact. In response to this call, crafters all over the United States began making these hats using patterns provided on the project website for use with either a knitting method, crocheting and even sewing with fabrics. The project's goal was to have one million hats handed out at the Washington March. The hats are made using pink yarns or fabrics and were originally designed to be a positive form of protest for Trump's inauguration by Krista Suh. Suh, from Los Angeles, wanted a hat for the cooler climate in Washington, D. C. and made herself a hat for the protest, realizing the potential: "we could all wear them, make a unified statement". One of the project founders, Jayna Zweiman, stated "I think it's resonating a lot because we're really saying that no matter who you are or where you are, you can be politically active." Suh and Zwieman worked with Kat Coyle, the owner of a local knitting supply shop called The Little Knittery, to come up with the original design. The project launched in November 2016 and quickly became popular on social media with over 100,000 downloads of the pattern to make the hat.

The name refers to the resemblance of the top corners of the hats to cat ears and attempts to reclaim the derogatory term "pussy", a play on Trump's widely reported 2005 remarks that women would let him "grab them by the pussy". Many of the hats worn by marchers in Washington, D.C., were created by crafters who were unable to attend and wished them to be worn by those who could, to represent their presence. Those hats optionally contained notes from the crafters to the wearers, expressing support. They were distributed by the crafters themselves, by yarn stores at the points of origin, carried to the event by marchers, and also distributed at the destination. The production of the hats caused reported shortages of pink knitting yarn across the United States. On the day of the march, NPR compared the hats to the "Make America Great Again" hats worn by Trump supporters, in that both represented groups that had at one point been politically marginalized; both sent "simultaneously unifying and antagonistic" messages; and both were simple in their messages. Pussyhats were featured later on the fashion runway, and on the covers of Time and The New Yorker.

Signage 
In Richmond, Virginia, attendees of the March on Washington participated in an "Art of Activism" series of workshops at Studio Two Three, a printmaking studio for artists in Scott's Addition.

In Los Angeles, actor Amir Talai was carrying the sign "I'll see you nice white ladies at the next #blacklivesmatter march right?" to express frustration at the lack of participation by white Americans in the Black Lives Matter movement, and simultaneously hopeful of encouraging them to do so. The photo of Talai with the sign went viral over the internet.

In January 2020, the National Archives acknowledged that it altered photographs of the Women's March on Washington, blurring the word Trump in a sign that reads, "God Hates Trump" and another that reads, "Trump & GOP — Hands Off Women" as well as other placards that referenced parts of a woman's anatomy. A spokesperson for the National Archives explained that the censorship was designed to avoid politicizing the event and to protect children and young people who might see the signs.

Response

Academics 
While the march aims to create a social movement, Marcia Chatelain of Georgetown University's Center for Social Justice commented that its success will depend on the marchers' ability to maintain momentum in the following weeks. "One of the goals of any type of march or any type of visible sign of solidarity is to get inspired, to inspire people to do more. And the question is, at the march, what kind of organizational structures or movements will also be present to help people know how to channel their energy for the next day and for the long haul?" Historian Michael Kazin also commented on the importance of a long-term strategy: "All successful movements in American history have both inside and outside strategy. If you're just protesting, and it just stops there, you're not going to get anything done."

In the aftermath of the protest, museum curators around the world sought to gather signs and other cultural artifacts of the marches.

Politicians 
Many members of the U.S. House of Representatives announced that they would not attend Trump's inauguration ceremony, with the numbers growing after he made disparaging remarks about veteran House member and civil rights leader John Lewis. Some of them said they would attend the Women's March.

Maine Representative Chellie Pingree said she would instead visit a Planned Parenthood center and a business owned by immigrants on Inauguration Day before going to Washington to appear on stage with other politicians who refused to attend. "We need to do everything we can to let the incoming administration know we are not happy about their agenda. I've had unprecedented numbers of my constituents calling me worried about healthcare, the environment, public education, and they feel disrespected," she said.

On January 22, 2017, Trump wrote on his personal Twitter account: "Watched protests yesterday but was under the impression that we just had an election! Why didn't these people vote? Celebs hurt cause badly." Two hours later, he sent a more placatory tweet: "Peaceful protests are a hallmark of our democracy. Even if I don't always agree, I recognize the rights of people to express their views." A White House official criticized the March for not welcoming abortion rights opponents, and then criticized Madonna's comment that she "thought an awful lot about blowing up the White House".

Senator Bernie Sanders, who attended the March in Montpelier, Vermont, said Trump should listen to the protesters: "Listen to the needs of women. Listen to the needs of the immigrant community. Listen to the needs of workers. Listen to what's going on with regards to climate change ... Modify your positions. Let's work together to try to save this planet and protect the middle class."

Hillary Clinton, the 2016 Democratic presidential candidate, offered her support on Twitter, calling the march "awe-inspiring" and stated "[I] hope it brought joy to others as it did to me".

Following a tweet that offended other lawmakers and the public, Bill Kintner resigned from his position as Nebraska State Senator.

John Carman, a Republican official in South Jersey mocked the Women's March, asking if the protest would "be over in time for them to cook dinner". He lost the next election on November 7, 2017, against a political newcomer, Ashley Bennett.

The Friedrich Ebert Foundation, which is associated with the Social Democratic Party of Germany, had planned to give their human rights award to the 2017 Women's March. After a German Jewish organization, however, protested in an open letter, accusing the organizers of antisemitic statements and ties to antisemites, the foundation put the award on ice.

Celebrities 
Apart from the celebrities present at the march, others such as Beyoncé and Bruce Springsteen made statements of support for it. The latter, who endorsed Hillary Clinton and is a friend to Barack Obama, gave a speech during a concert in Australia, saying, "The E Street Band is glad to be here in Western Australia. But we're a long way from home, and our hearts and spirits are with the hundreds of thousands of women and men that marched yesterday in every city in America and in Melbourne who rallied against hate and division and in support of tolerance, inclusion, reproductive rights, civil rights, racial justice, LGBTQ rights, the environment, wage equality, gender equality, healthcare, and immigrant rights. We stand with you. We are the new American resistance."

Cyndi Lauper commented on Madonna's controversial speech at the Washington march, saying, "Anger is not better than clarity and humanity. That is what opens people's minds. When you want to change people's mind, you have to share your real story."

Jon Voight called the march "destructive" and said it was "against the president and against the government". He was particularly critical of Shia LaBeouf and march participant Miley Cyrus, saying "they have a lot of followers" and felt their stances were "teaching treason".

Piers Morgan, a friend of Trump's, stated the march was a reaction by women that "a man won" and that "At its core, it was about Trump-hating and resentment that he won and Hillary lost". He also felt that it was democratic to protest, but not due to the result of a democratic election. In response to Morgan's comments about the march, Ewan McGregor canceled his appearance on Good Morning Britain, which Morgan was hosting.

Follow-up 

Following the march, the organizers of the Women's March on Washington posted the "10 Actions for the first 100 Days" campaign to keep up the momentum from the march. The first action included contacting senators about concerns, with an option of using "Hear Our Voice" postcards. A new action was provided every 10 days.

Filmmaker Michael Moore called for 100 days of resistance, for Trump's first 100 days of his presidency.

In July 2017, the Women's March official Twitter feed celebrated the birthday of Assata Shakur, an African-American on the FBI most wanted terrorists list who was convicted of murder, leading to criticism from conservative media outlets. In an August 1, 2017, editorial, Bari Weiss criticized three co-chairs for their association with Louis Farrakhan, and for failing to reject anti-Semitism. In a reply letter, co-chair Bob Bland dismissed critics as "apologists for the status quo, racist ideology and the white nationalist patriarchy".

In October 2017, leaders of the decentralized Women's Marches across the country formed a new organization, March On, and launched a Super PAC called March On's Fight Back PAC. Led by Vanessa Wruble, one of the co-founders and chief architects of the Women's March on Washington, March On announced the goal of creating political change through their "March on the Polls" campaign, including marching people to voting booths for the November 2018 midterms for a "March on the Midterms". "March on aims to coordinate actions at the federal, state, and local level.

On January 21, 2018, a second Women's March was held, taking place in cities around the world. Demonstrations were also held in 2019, 2020, 2021, and 2022.

Locations 

The 2017 Women's Marches took place in many cities around the world since January 21, 2017.

See also 

 "Tiny Hands", a song released by Fiona Apple for the march
 Donald Trump Access Hollywood tape
 Women's Sunday, 1908 women's march in London, England to rally for suffrage
 Woman Suffrage Procession, a 1913 demonstration in Washington D.C. led by Alice Paul, to rally for suffrage
 Women's March (South Africa), to protest the introduction of the Apartheid pass laws in Pretoria, August 9, 1956
 Million Woman March, Philadelphia, Pennsylvania, October 25, 1997
 List of protest marches on Washington, D.C.
The Why Are You Marching? project, archived at Smith College's Sophia Smith Collection of Women's History
Women's March Oral History Project, Stanford Historical Society Oral History Program

Notes

References

Further reading

External links 

 
Finding Aid to one of the largest collections of ephemera and posters from marches across California at the Sutro Library San Francisco, CA

2017 in Africa
2017 in American politics
2017 in Asia
2017 in Europe
2017 in North America
2017 in Oceania
March
2017 protests
Articles containing video clips
Foreign relations of the United States
Fourth-wave feminism
Gatherings of women
History of women's rights
Inauguration of Donald Trump
January 2017 events
Protests against Donald Trump
Protests against results of elections
Reactions to the election of Donald Trump
2017 Women's March
Women's marches in the United States